Thomas John Luxmore is a Canadian ice hockey referee.

Career 
Luxmore worked as a full-time as a referee in the ECHL for both the 2011–12 and 2012–13 seasons. He made his NHL debut on November 19, 2013, officiating a match-up at Joe Louis Arena between the Nashville Predators and Detroit Red Wings.

References

National Hockey League officials
Living people
Year of birth missing (living people)